Employment tribunals are tribunal public bodies in England and Wales and Scotland which have statutory jurisdiction to hear many kinds of disputes between employers and employees. The most common disputes are concerned with unfair dismissal, redundancy payments and employment discrimination. The tribunals are part of the UK tribunals system, administered by the HM Courts and Tribunals Service and regulated and supervised by the Administrative Justice and Tribunals Council.

History
Employment tribunals were created as industrial tribunals by the Industrial Training Act 1964. Industrial tribunals were judicial bodies consisting of a lawyer, who was the chairman, an individual nominated by an employer association, and another by the Trades Union Congress (TUC) or by a TUC-affiliated union. These independent panels heard and made legally binding rulings in relation to employment law disputes. Under the Employment Rights (Dispute Resolution) Act 1998, their name was changed to employment tribunals from 1 August 1998. Employment tribunals continue to perform the same function as the industrial tribunals.

Jurisdiction
Employment tribunals may hear claims brought within three months for issues related to ‘’statutory’’ breaches only. The statutory breaches are listed below.

Under the Employment Rights Act 1996:

 Unfair dismissal
 Unlawful wage deductions or required payments to employers
 Disputes regarding written particulars of employment
 Disputes regarding itemised pay statements
 Breach of the National Minimum Wage
 Disputes regarding time off for public duty (including jury service)
 Maternity, paternity and adoption issues: pay and leave

Under the Equality Act 2010:

 claims of breach of equality clauses
 failure to provide equality of terms
 when a case is referred by another court

Under the Trade Union and Labour Relations (Consolidation) Act 1992:

 Unfair dismissal and other actions for reasons related to trade union membership or participation in industrial action
 Offering of inducements to not join a trade union or opt-out from collective bargaining agreements
 Blacklisting
 Issues related to taking time off for union duties
 Failure to consult a recognised union or representative organisation over a proposed redundancy or over changes to training
 Disputes over union membership including disciplinary action or expulsion of members

Also, action can be brought under a number of other statutes:

 the Working Time Regulations for issues related to rest breaks, rest periods, detriments for failure to work in excess of the maximum time etc.
 the National Minimum Wage Act 1998
 the Employment Relations Act 1999, for failing to allow workers to be accompanied at disciplinary or grievance hearings
 the Transfer of Undertakings (Protection of Employment) Regulations 2006

Procedure

There are separate employment tribunal systems for Scotland, and for England and Wales. A claim may not be presented in Scotland for proceedings in England and Wales, and vice versa, but it is possible to transfer proceedings between the two jurisdictions in certain circumstances. Since 2004, the same Rules of Procedure have governed both jurisdictions, with references to the appropriate civil law nomenclature differences between them. Scottish employment tribunal practice follows Scots civil law, and differs markedly from the procedure used in England and Wales.

Employment tribunals are constituted and operate according to statutory rules issued by the Secretary of State. These rules, known as the Employment Tribunals Rules of Procedure, set out the Tribunals' main objectives and procedures, and matters such as time limits for making a claim, and dealing with requests for reviews. The rules for appeals are governed by the separate Rules of the Employment Appeal Tribunal.

A party making a claim has to present (i.e. deliver) their claim on a prescribed form, within the appropriate time limit, including all mandatory information. Since the 2013 changes in procedure recommended by the Underhill Review a claim form may only be presented by one of three prescribed methods; electronically using an online form on the gov.uk website, by a paper form posted to a central processing office, or by a paper form handed in at the counter at designated Employment Tribunal offices. It will not be accepted if it is posted to an individual Employment Tribunal office or presented by email. If a claim form is late, even by a few seconds, then the employment tribunal may not be permitted to hear it and the claim may be dismissed on that basis alone, without a consideration of the merits, at a pre-hearing review. For most types of claim the claimant must first contact Acas (the Advisory, Conciliation and Arbitration Service).

A party defending a claim has to present a response form (a prescribed form) to the employment tribunal handling the claim within 28 days of being sent the claim form by the employment tribunal. If a party fails to present a response form, then it will be debarred from taking part in proceedings, which may proceed undefended.

The employment tribunals are expected to reject a claim form or a response form if it is not provided on a prescribed form. Also, certain information must be provided on the form for it to be valid and accepted.

The rules concerning time limits are complex but the typical time limit for making a claim is three months from the date of the act complained of, such as being unfairly dismissed or not being paid wages. The employment tribunals may grant an extension of time to bring a complaint if certain conditions are met, the test that applies depends upon the complaint with three broad categories. A complaint of unfair dismissal, breach of contract, unlawful deduction from wages and other similar claims can only be considered if it was not reasonably practicable for the complaint to have been presented before, and if the complaint is presented within a reasonable time thereafter. This is a matter of evidence for the person bringing the claim. In discrimination complaints, the time limit is less strict, and a claim may be heard if it is late if it is considered to be just and equitable to do so.

Time limits of six months apply for claims for equal pay (taken from the end of employment with no extensions at all), and for a redundancy payment (with a consideration as to whether or not it was reasonably practicable to present the claim in time).

Claims are normally initiated by individuals and normally responded to by employers, or former employers, or trade unions. The terms "claimant" and "respondent" are used to describe the parties involved in tribunal proceedings. Normally each party pays its own costs. Tribunals will order one party to pay the other party's costs in exceptional circumstances, where it is claimed that one party has claimed vexatiously.

If a former employee brings a claim for breach of contract, then the defending employer has a limited right to bring a counter-claim for breach of contract against a former employee. However, an employer may not bring a claim for breach of contract if an employee is complaining simply of unfair dismissal (which is not a claim for breach of contract but a statutory claim). In all cases, the employment tribunal may not award damages that exceed £25,000 for all claims for breach of contract.

One peculiarity of the employment tribunals is that a claim for breach of contract cannot be brought until the employee's employment has ended, and a claim can only be brought if it arises or is outstanding on the termination of employment. The employment tribunals also can only hear certain types of claim for breach of contract, under the Employment Tribunals (Extension of Jurisdiction) Orders 1994, which are statutory instruments. There are two orders, one for Scotland and one for England and Wales.

Both an employer and an employee may bring claims for a reference to be made to an employment tribunal for a declaration as to the contents of a statement of particulars of employment, which may arise if there is a dispute as to the content of a contract.

Tribunals are intended to be informal and to encourage parties to represent themselves. There is no special court dress or complex civil procedure rules as at the County Court.

The confidential use of conciliation is encouraged, and parties have an Acas officer assigned to most claims to assist the parties in reaching a binding agreement to end the claim. All communications with Acas are subject to privilege and are confidential unless the party waives that right. The parties may also settle a claim by a settlement agreement, or, if at a hearing, by drawing up a Tomlin Order and asking the employment tribunal to agree to the disposal of the case in accordance with that order.

If a person habitually and without reasonable excuse brings vexatious proceedings in the employment tribunals, a government law officer may apply to the Employment Appeal Tribunal for an order declaring that person to be a vexatious litigant, which has the effect of barring that person from bringing further proceedings in the employment tribunals without the consent of the Employment Appeal Tribunal.

Hearings
Prior to a hearing case management may take place to hand down directions as to how the full hearing will be heard. This can be by one of several means, either through correspondence between the parties and the employment tribunal or in a case management discussion (CMD). An increasing number of case management discussions take place by telephone.

The Employment Tribunals Rules of Procedure allow for several types of hearing:

 A Case Management Discussion; (this is used to clarify issues and determine the Directions for a case).
 A Pre-Hearing Review (to determine the entitlement of a party to bring or defend proceedings), or an entitlement to Interim Relief (a form of preliminary finding in certain types of claim involving Trade Union activities or making a protected disclosure (whistleblowing), which may order a former employer to continue to pay a dismissed employee until a full hearing;
 A Full Hearing (which may determine liability and/or remedy):
 A Review Hearing (to re-consider a judgment).

If the case proceeds to a full hearing, the case is heard, subject to certain exceptions, by a tribunal of three people, a legally qualified Employment Judge, and two lay members. The lay members use their employment experience in judging the facts. During the hearing the Employment Judge is under a duty to ensure that the hearing is conducted fairly, taking into account both sides' submissions on the law and facts. Generally witnesses are called on both sides, with witness statements being supplied in advance. However Civil Court Procedure is different in Scotland where there is no provision for written witness statements. Each witness will give their evidence in chief orally.

A claim (or part of it) may be determined at a Pre-Hearing Review and a judgment may be issued to either dismiss a case or to allow it to proceed to a hearing. Once a judgment is issued in respect of a particular matter, that matter is determined and, subject to an appeal or a review, it cannot be re-opened.

One of the lay members should have experience from the employer's side of disputes and the other from the trade union movement. Sometimes the Employment Judge sits alone, for example, to hear preliminary legal arguments or in a case involving a claim for unpaid wages. The Employment Tribunals Rules of Procedure govern the circumstances in which an Employment Judge may sit alone.

A party bringing a claim does have the right to withdraw a claim by writing in to inform the tribunal at any time, to bring the claim to an end. A withdrawal can be done verbally at a hearing. A party may still be liable for the other side's costs after a withdrawal.

Reviews and appeals
A party may apply to the Tribunal that has issued a judgment requesting a review of that Tribunal's own decision or judgment. A tribunal may also review its decision of its own motion. Reviews may be granted where an error is relatively minor, for example a clerical error, under Rule 37 of the Rules of Procedure (known as the "slip rule"), where an obvious and important mistake, such as the name of a party being incorrectly spelt in the heading, appears in the judgment. The Tribunal will then issue a Certificate of Correction, to state the alteration to the Judgment.

Where a party believes the Tribunal has misapplied the law or acted perversely, the review process is inappropriate and the party must appeal to the Employment Appeal Tribunal. For example, the right of an employment judge to strike-out all or part of a claim while sitting alone in a Case Management Discussion would be outside the power of the employment judge, and therefore amount to an error of law that the Employment Appeal Tribunal could reverse.

Parties are expected to comply with strictly enforced time limits when applying for a review or appeal. The time limit for a Review application is within 14 days of the judgment being issued, with a discretion to extend the time limit on a just and equitable basis.

For an appeal to the Employment Appeal Tribunal against a judgment (but not an Interim Order), a valid Notice of Appeal must be lodged at the relevant office of the Employment Appeal Tribunal (London or Edinburgh) by 4 pm on the 42nd day after the employment tribunal issued its written reasons for the Judgment. This time limit is strictly enforced and appeals are often rejected due to the time limit being missed or an incomplete Notice of Appeal being lodged (for example, if one page of the Judgment is missing, the Notice of Appeal is invalid). An interim Tribunal order must be appealed within 14 days, and reasons must be provided (which may need to be asked for at the original hearing).

Unpaid awards
The Taylor Review referred to "widespread concerns about the number of employment tribunal awards that go unpaid" and reported that government-commissioned research undertaken in 2013 had shown that, following enforcement action taken by an individual, 34% of employment tribunal awards in England and Wales and 46% in Scotland remained unpaid. In December 2018 the Department for Business, Energy and Industrial Strategy introduced a "naming scheme" to exert reputational pressure on employers who fail to pay awards. Only awards of £200 or more are affected by the scheme.

Administration 
The Employment Tribunal is part of HMCTS, which in turn is a branch of the Ministry of Justice. Prior to the merger of HM Courts Service and the Tribunals Service to form  the Employment Tribunals maintained a list of claims in which Employment Tribunals had jurisdiction at that time.

Charging structure 
In July 2013 the system was changed so that a fee of £160 or £250 must be paid by the individual when starting their employment tribunal and a further payment of £230 or £950 for the actual hearing.

This led to a sharp decline in the number of tribunal cases in the following 12 months.

In July 2017, the Supreme Court ruled that the employment tribunal fees were unlawful. The Ministry of Justice subsequently announced it would cease to charge the fees and refund those already paid.

Statistics
The Employment Tribunals Service published its Annual Report and Accounts for 2005-06 in July 2006 which included these key points:
In 2005/2006, there were 115,039 claims accepted, compared with 86,181 in 2004/2005 and 115,042 in 2003/2004.
18% of claims were successful at a full hearing in 2005/2006; the remainder were either settled, withdrawn, unsuccessful or otherwise disposed of.
The median award for unfair dismissal was £4,228; the average award was £8,679.
The median award for discrimination was between £5,546 and £9,021 (depending on the type of discrimination).
Costs were awarded against claimants in 148 cases, and against respondents in 432 cases. The median costs award was £1,136.
867 Employment Tribunal decisions were appealed to the Employment Appeal Tribunal. Of those, 191 were withdrawn, 378 were dismissed and the remaining 298 appeals were allowed.

See also
Labour Tribunal (Hong Kong)

References

External links

Chartered Institute of Personnel and Development (CIPD) resources on tribunals
Acas has a legal duty to offer free conciliation where a complaint about employment rights has been made to an employment tribunal

United Kingdom tribunals
United Kingdom labour law
Courts and tribunals established in 1964
Ministry of Justice (United Kingdom)
Labour courts
1964 establishments in the United Kingdom